United States Army Second Lieutenant Robert Craig (June 7, 1919–July 11, 1943) received the Medal of Honor for heroic service as an infantry officer during the Allied invasion of Sicily in World War II.

Early life
Robert Craig was born in Scotland, emigrating with his family to the United States and settling in Toledo, Ohio. He had two siblings; William Craig, Jr. and Jane M. Craig. All three children were born in Scotland and immigrated to the United States (Toledo) with their parents; William Craig, Sr. and Jane (Montgomery) Craig.

Military service
Craig entered the United States Army in February 1941 and was commissioned a Second Lieutenant of infantry. Lieutenant Craig served with the 15th Infantry of the Third Infantry Division.

On July 11, 1943, during his service leading troops in Operation Husky, the Allied invasion of Sicily, Craig set out to destroy an Italian Army machine gun nest that had halted the advance of his company, making his attempt following the wounding of three other officers who had tried to locate and silence that machine gun emplacement.  Craig located the enemy position and snaked his way to a point within 35 yards of the gun before being discovered.  Charging into the answering fire, Craig reached the machine gun and killed its three crewmen.

Shortly thereafter, as his company advanced further, Craig and his platoon, in a position devoid of cover and concealment on the forward (downhill) slope of a ridge, encountered the fire of approximately 100 enemy soldiers.  Craig ordered his men to withdraw to the cover of the crest while he drew the enemy fire to himself, charging the enemy until he was within 25 yards of them.  From a kneeling position, he killed five and wounded three enemy soldiers while providing the covering fire enabling his platoon to reach the cover of the crest. Lt. Craig was killed by enemy fire, but his men carried on.  His example is credited with spurring them to victory.

Posthumous honors
On May 26, 1944, Lt. Craig posthumously received the Medal of Honor for "conspicuous gallantry and intrepidity at the risk of life, above and beyond the call of duty."

During construction of the Toledo, Ohio freeway system, a bascule bridge crossing the Maumee River was named the Robert Craig Memorial Bridge in his honor, eventually carrying Interstate 280. Today, this bridge still exists as a local street, carrying Ohio State Route 65 across the Maumee River between North Summit Street and Front Street.

Honored in ship naming
The U.S. Army ship USAT Lt. Robert Craig which operated in the Pacific Ocean at the end of World War II was named in his honor.

See also

List of Medal of Honor recipients
List of Medal of Honor recipients for World War II

References

External links

1919 births
1943 deaths
United States Army officers
United States Army Medal of Honor recipients
United States Army personnel killed in World War II
Scottish-born Medal of Honor recipients
World War II recipients of the Medal of Honor
British emigrants to the United States